Ali Maatouk Omran Al-Snousi (born 4 January 1988) is a Libyan professional footballer who plays as a defender for Al-Ahli Tripoli and the Libya national team.

References

External links
 
 
 

1988 births
Living people
People from Sabha, Libya
Libyan footballers
Association football defenders
Al-Hilal SC (Benghazi) players
Al-Ahly SC (Benghazi) players
Al-Ahli SC (Tripoli) players
Libyan expatriate footballers
Expatriate footballers in Tunisia
Libyan expatriate sportspeople in Tunisia
Tunisian Ligue Professionnelle 1 players
Stade Tunisien players
Libya international footballers
Libyan Premier League players
Libya A' international footballers
2018 African Nations Championship players